Levy Muaka Mutsotso is a retired Kenyan midfielder who featured for Kenyan Premier League sides Nairobi City Stars, Sofapaka F.C., Tusker F.C. and the kenya national football team as a winger.

Club career
Levy joined Nairobi City Stars from Securicor Kitale in 2006 and served the club for two-and-a-half seasons before joining Sofapaka F.C. for the remainder of the 2009 season.

He returned to Nairobi City Stars in 2010 and for part of the 2012 season. He was back for the last part of the 2014
 season, and the entire 2015 season. In 2011
 he featured for Tusker F.C.

Between 2012 and 2014, Levy is believed to have gone abroad in search of opportunities. Earlier in 2010 and 2011, he had been linked with trial moves to South Africa and France.

Levy won two Kenyan Premier League titles with Sofapaka F.C. in 2009 and with Tusker F.C. in 2011.

International
Levy earned four national team caps between 2010 and 2011. He made, and scored, on his debut on 18 Aug 2010 as kenya national football team beat host Ethiopia 3-0 in a friendly at Addis Ababa Stadium.

Honours

Club
Sofapaka
 Kenyan Premier League title:(2009) 
Tusker
 Kenyan Premier League title:(2011)

References

External links
 
 

1988 births
Living people
Kenyan footballers
Nairobi City Stars players
Sofapaka F.C. players
Tusker F.C. players
Kenyan Premier League players
Association football midfielders